Johannes Hans Balzli, more commonly known as Johannes Balzli, was an Austrian/German author, newspaper editor, Theosophist and Armanist, most notable for his biography of Guido von List, entitled, "Guido v. List: Der Wiederentdecker Uralter Arischer Weisheit - Sein Leben und sein Schaffen" . ("Guido v. List - The Rediscoverer of Ancient Aryan Wisdom - His Life and His Work.")

Biography
The biography on List was published while Theosophists acknowledged List's nationalist popularization of their doctrines, that was published in Vienna by the Guido-von-List-Gesellschaft in 1917, and republished later in the 20th century by Adolf Schleipfer.

This biography of List was the only book length biography of List that exists and indeed that has ever been written.

Balzli was the secretary of the Leipzig Theosophical Society and editor of occult magazine Prana (occult magazine) (1909–19)  of which was initially edited by astrologer Karl Brandler-Pracht.

During 1916 and 1917 List wrote several articles on the approaching national millennium, which was supposed to be realized once the Allies had been defeated, Balzli published 2 of these predictions in Prana in 1917.

Written works

 "Guido v. List: Der Wiederentdecker Uralter Arischer Weisheit - Sein Leben und sein Schaffen" .  Vienna, Guido-von-List-Gesellschaft, 1917. ("Guido v. List - The Rediscoverer of Ancient Aryan Wisdom - His Life and His Work.")
 Magisch okkulte Unterrichtsbriefe: zehn Lehrbriefe zur Entwicklung der Willenskraft und der okkulten Fähigkeiten / bearb. republished in 2002 by Schikowski
 Okkultistische Unterrichtsbriefe: 10 Lehrbriefe zur Entwickelung d. Willenskraft u. d. okkulten Fähigkeiten
 Das Problem des Cölibats vom Standpunkte des Okkultismus : T. 1. [2]
 Eurhythmie

See also
Guido von List
Adolf Schleipfer

References
The Occult Roots of Nazism by Nicholas Goodrick-Clarke, pp. 27, 45 and 47.
Flowers' introduction to The Secret of the Runes translated by Dr. Stephen E. Flowers Ph.D.

Notes

External links 
 Works by and about Johannes Balzli in the German National Library catalogue
 More works by and about Johannes Balzli in the German National Library catalogue

Year of birth missing
Year of death missing
20th-century Austrian people
20th-century German people
Austrian male writers

Austrian occultists
German occultists
Occultism in Nazism
German male writers